Songjeong Station is a station on Seoul Subway Line 5 in Gangseo-gu, Seoul.

Station layout

Vicinity
Exit 1 : Songjeong Elementary School
Exit 2 : Gonghang Elementary & Middle Schools
Exit 3 : Doksuri Gonghang APT
Exit 4 : Gimpo Airport

References

Railway stations opened in 1996
Seoul Metropolitan Subway stations
Metro stations in Gangseo District, Seoul